The John Yeon Speculative House is a historic house located in Portland, Oregon, United States, built in 1939. It is listed on the National Register of Historic Places. It is one of a series of speculative houses by native Oregon architect and conservationist John Yeon following the critically acclaimed Watzek House (1936).  The series included nine houses built between 1938 and 1940 in Lake Oswego and Portland.  The houses used a modular design concept that pioneered the use of external plywood as a building material and separate ventilation louvers, which allowed for series of fixed pane glass to be inset between vertical mullions. Yeon is frequently cited as one of the originators of what became known as the Northwest Regional style of architecture.

References

Houses completed in 1939
John Yeon buildings
Modernist architecture in Oregon
Houses on the National Register of Historic Places in Portland, Oregon
1939 establishments in Oregon
Arbor Lodge, Portland, Oregon